Jean-Baptiste Léopold Levert (11 October 1819 – 24 July 1882) was a French landscape artist, printmaker, engraver, and designer.  He began as a genre painter but joined the Impressionists in their first exhibition in 1874.  Although his work appears in the catalogs of the exhibitions, most of it has been lost and no trace of the work that was exhibited survives.

He started his career as a draftsman of military uniforms, but encouraged by his friend Edgar Degas he turned to landscape painting . He was friends with Henri Rouart and Eugène Rouart. Henri Rouart was also a friend of Degas and an enthusiastic participant in the exhibitions of the Impressionists. Léopold Levert would also participate in the exhibitions at the invitation of Degas. Levert participated in four of the eight Impressionist exhibitions, specifically in the first (1874), the second (1876), the third (1877) and the fifth (1880).

Work
 Les Bords de l'Essonne
 Le Moulin de Touviaux
 Près d' Auvers
 Vue de Portrieux
 Plage de Portrieux
 La Jetée de Portrieux
 Port de Portrieux
 Bords de l'Essonne
 Maison à Vauldray
 La ferme de Saint Marc
 Vue prize à Buttier
 Les chemins à Noiseau 
 Paysage du Limousin
 Étude à Malesherbes 
 Route sur le plateau de Fontenay
 Sabonnière de Fontainebleau
 Étude de forêt
 Moulin de Touviaux
 Les Bords de l'Essonne
 Chaumières à Carteret
 Plaine à Barbizon
 Une plâtrière à Fontenay
 Plaine de la Brie
 Cadre d'eaux fortes

References

People from Nord (French department)
People from Fontenay-sous-Bois
19th-century French painters
French Impressionist painters
1819 births
1882 deaths